"Stop and Smell the Roses" is the title of a 1974 song (see 1974 in music) by the American singer-songwriter Mac Davis. The song was written by Davis and the noted bandleader and trumpeter Doc Severinsen.

Released as a single from his album of the same name (not to be confused with the album released in 1981 by Ringo Starr), the song "Stop and Smell the Roses" became Davis' second Top 10 hit on the U.S. pop chart, where it peaked at No. 9 in the fall of 1974. The song remained in the Top 40 for ten weeks. On the U.S. adult contemporary chart, "Stop and Smell the Roses" became the singer's second No. 1 hit, following "Baby, Don't Get Hooked on Me". On the U.S. country music chart, where Davis has enjoyed considerable success, the song reached No. 40. Also that year, Henson Cargill took a rendition to No. 29 on the same chart.

Severinsen was best known as the bandleader on the NBC late-night talk show The Tonight Show. Davis was an occasional guest on the show, and during this time the two became acquainted. Following an appearance on the show, Severinsen approached Davis with the idea of recording a song that included the phrase "stop and smell the roses", since he had recently heard the phrase from a physician. Soon after, Davis vacationed in Hawaii and wrote the song, crediting Severinsen as a co-writer for giving him the idea. Severinsen was quoted as saying that Davis "could have gone ahead and written the song and not done that." On an episode of Gilbert Gottfried's Amazing Colossal Podcast, Davis remembered calling Severinsen and saying, "I think we wrote a hit!"

The lyrics to the song advise that while it is often necessary to forsake family obligations and pleasurable activities to succeed professionally, everyone should make sure that they take some time to "stop and smell the roses along the way".

Chart performance

Weekly charts

Year-end charts

See also
List of number-one adult contemporary singles of 1974 (U.S.)

References

External links
 

1974 singles
Mac Davis songs
Henson Cargill songs
Songs written by Mac Davis
1974 songs
Song recordings produced by Gary Klein (producer)
Columbia Records singles